Diego Felipe Gómez de Angulo (born 1676 in Burgos) was a Spanish clergyman and bishop for the Roman Catholic Archdiocese of Antequera, Oaxaca. He was ordained in 1744. He was appointed bishop in 1745. He died in 1752.

References 

1676 births
1752 deaths
Spanish Roman Catholic bishops
People from Burgos